The Keys Handover Memorial in Belgrade, Serbia, marks the spot where on 6 April 1867, the town keys of the several Serbian fortresses were given to Prince Mihailo Obrenović by the Ottoman Turks. That moment was an important step towards Serbian international recognition at the Treaty of Berlin in 1878.

The memorial was declared a Protected Historic Landmark in 1991, and it is protected by Republic of Serbia.

History
The Keys Handover Memorial marks the place on Kalemegdan where a ceremonial, symbolic, handing over the keys of Belgrade, Smederevo, Šabac and Kladovo fortresses was made represent a material evidence which indirectly expresses the importance of the event in Serbian history. The symbolic handing over the keys to these cities, on the right side of the main entrance to Kalemegdan, followed by the after Prince Mihailo Obrenović received in Constantinople, on 30 March 1867 The decree of the Turkish Sultan Abdülaziz of the first, which the prince of the Serbian people and cities submitted for care and management. Return of the cities, although other Serbian vassal obligation stayed, such as paying tribute to the Sublime Porte and holding Turkish flags, meant overcoming yet another obstacle in obtaining complete independence; thus began a new phase in the life of the Serbs.

Memorial
For the centennial of the event, a memorial was created in order to mark the spot for the future generations. A white marble block, created by Mihailo Paonović, was put in place in 1967, with a carved drawing by A. Srefanović. A celebration accompanied the occasion.

See also
 Protected Historic Landmarks
 Tourism in Serbia

References

External links
 

 

1967 sculptures
1967 establishments in Serbia
Buildings and structures completed in 1967
Monuments and memorials in Serbia
Monuments and memorials in Belgrade
Culture in Belgrade
19th century in Belgrade
Protected Historic Landmarks
Stari Grad, Belgrade